"The Thresher's Labour" is one of three poems written by Stephen Duck in 1730. It describes Duck's struggles as an agricultural labourer, and the situation of the early eighteenth-century British working class in general. H. Gustav Klaus said it was the most accurate description of working life in verse, and praised Duck's recognition that work deserved a literary treatment. "The Thresher's Labour" became the voice, in a sense, for the rural labourers who were oppressed. It also became a model for other labouring-class artists, who began to write about their own lives and  daily experiences. It was the start of a new genre of literature developed by working-class people.

History and background
Duck wrote "The Thresher's Labour" after a friend, Reverend Stanley, suggested that Duck write about his life. A pirated edition of the text was published in Poems on Several Subjects in 1730, and a revised and authorised version in Poems on Several Occasions in 1736.

Themes

"The Thresher's Labour" gives details about the hard, tedious labour of an agricultural worker of the 18th century:

His characterisation of the agricultural cycle as a destructive machine controlled by "The Master" has been contrasted with the traditional depictions of pastoral scenes.

Response to The Thresher's Labour
In "The Thresher's Labour," Stephen Duck could be seen to imply that women did not contribute much during the harvests, the hardest time of the year. Duck portrays the workers as strong men, covered in dust from their work, while mentioning that the women are at home taking care of the children.

These statements provoked some readers, in particular  Mary Collier, a washerwoman who knew that women often worked alongside the men. Collier wrote a poem called "The Woman's Labour" as a direct response to Duck's "The Thresher's Labour." "The Woman's Labour" corrects and criticizes Duck's statements about women's contributions, at times point by point.

Further reading

Duck, Stephen. The Thresher's Labour. Full text
Van-Hagen, Steve. (Fall 2007) [http://muse.jhu.edu/journals/criticism/v047/47.4van-hagen.html Literary Technique, the Aestheticization of Laboring Experience, and Generic Experimentation in Stephen Duck's The Thresher's Labour]. Criticism'' 47 (4). 421-450.

References

18th-century poems
English poems
1730 poems